Carex densa is a tussock-forming species of perennial sedge in the family Cyperaceae. It is native to westen parts of North America.

See also
List of Carex species

References

densa
Taxa named by Liberty Hyde Bailey
Plants described in 1889
Flora of Washington (state)
Flora of Mexico
Flora of California
Flora of Oregon